Andonectes is a genus of beetles in the family Dytiscidae, containing the following species:

 Andonectes aequatorius (Régimbart, 1899)
 Andonectes apure García, 2002
 Andonectes bordoni García, 2002
 Andonectes gregarius García, 2002
 Andonectes intermedius García, 2002
 Andonectes maximus Trémouilles, 2001
 Andonectes meridensis García, 2002
 Andonectes mildredae García, 2002
 Andonectes milla García, 2002
 Andonectes pineiroi García, 2002
 Andonectes septentrionalis García, 2002
 Andonectes similaris García, 2002
 Andonectes trujillo García, 2002
 Andonectes venezuelanus García, 2002

References

Dytiscidae